Chang Mei-hwei (born 1949) is a Taiwanese pediatric hepatologist.

Career
Chang graduated from the National Taiwan University College of Medicine, completed fellowship training in pediatric gastroenterology at UCLA Health, and later returned to Taiwan, subsequently serving as a distinguished chair professor within NTU's Department of Pediatrics. Chang has researched hepatitis B vaccination, biliary atresia in infants, and led the Children's Liver Foundation. She was featured in the 2016 documentary Taiwan Revealed: Medical Elite.

Honors
In 2013, Chang was awarded the TWAS Prize in Medical Science. The following year, she was elected an academician of Academia Sinica. Chang was elected to fellowship within The World Academy of Sciences in 2018.

References

Women pediatricians
National Taiwan University alumni
Members of Academia Sinica
TWAS fellows
Taiwanese women physicians
1949 births
Academic staff of the National Taiwan University
Taiwanese pediatricians
Taiwanese hepatologists
20th-century Taiwanese physicians
21st-century women physicians
Living people
20th-century women physicians